Vandalia Railroad may refer to:
Vandalia Railroad (1983), a shortline subsidiary of Pioneer Railcorp
Vandalia Railroad (1905–1917), a subsidiary of the Pennsylvania Railroad

See also 
Vandalia (disambiguation)